Princess Caroline of Hesse-Rheinfels-Rotenburg (18 August 1714 – 14 June 1741) was Princess of Condé by marriage to Louis Henri, Duke of Bourbon.

Early life
Born at Rotenburg an der Fulda in Hesse, Germany, she was the daughter of Ernest Leopold, Landgrave of Hesse-Rotenburg, head of the Roman Catholic branch of the House of Hesse, by his wife, Countess Eleonore of Löwenstein-Wertheim-Rochefort. She was one of ten children.

Marriage

On 23 July 1728, she married Louis Henri, Duke of Bourbon, at Sarry in France. Louis Henri was a French prince of the Blood Royal and head of the House of Condé, a branch of the House of Bourbon. Maternally, he was a grandson of Louis XIV of France through his mother, one of the king's legitimated daughters. By the time of his second marriage to Caroline, Louis Henri had lost the sight of one eye and the attractive slenderness his height bestowed upon him in youth. After marriage she was known at the French court as Madame la Duchesse. 

The previous Princess of Condé had been Marie Anne de Bourbon, who had died eight years before the marriage between Caroline and Louis Henri. Caroline was alleged to have been pretty and to have been included on a list of possible wives for Louis XV of France, but had been removed on account of her bad temper. When her husband was banished to his estates in 1725, Madame la Duchesse was obliged to withdraw with him to the Château de Chantilly until Monsieur le Duc was pardoned and the couple were allowed to resume attendance at the royal court again in 1730, where they lived quietly at the Hôtel de Condé. The couple had one child eight years into their marriage: Louis Joseph de Bourbon.

Her husband died at the Château de Chantilly on 27 January 1740, in the same year the future Marquis de Sade was born at the Hôtel de Condé; his mother was Caroline's lady in waiting. Caroline died in Paris one year later, in June 1741, and was buried at the Carmel du faubourg Saint-Jacques in Paris.

Legacy
In 1745, her niece Princess Viktoria of Hesse-Rheinfels-Rotenburg, would marry Charles, Prince of Soubise, head of the junior branch of the House of Rohan and father of Charlotte de Rohan, who would also marry a Prince of Condé.

In 1767, one of her nieces, Princess Maria Luisa of Savoy, would come to France to marry the young Louis Alexandre de Bourbon. She would become the great friend of Marie Antoinette as the princesse de Lamballe and be murdered by a revolutionary mob in Paris during the September Massacres of 1792.

Issue
Louis Joseph de Bourbon (9 August 1736 – 13 May 1818); next Prince of Condé.

Ancestry

Notes

References
 
 Mouffle d'Angerville, The Private Life of Louis XV. "Annotated and amplified by quotations from original and unpublished documents by Albert Mirac." Translated from the French by H.S. Mingard. 1924, New York; Boni and Liveright.  D'Angerville's original title: Vie privée de Louis XV, ou principaux évènements, particularités et anecdotes de son règne. 4 vols. crown 8vo., published in London in 1781. Meyrac says he "extracted these piquant pages" from the original.

1714 births
1741 deaths
People from Rotenburg an der Fulda
House of Hesse-Kassel
House of Bourbon-Condé
Princesses of Condé
Duchesses of Bourbon
Burials at the Carmel du faubourg Saint-Jacques
Landgravines of Hesse-Rotenburg
17th-century German people
18th-century German people
Daughters of monarchs